Mill Peak is a prominent peak,  high, rising above the Antarctic ice sheet  south of Pearce Peak and  south of Cape Simpson. it was discovered in February 1931 by the British Australian New Zealand Antarctic Research Expedition under Douglas Mawson, who named it for Dr. Hugh Robert Mill.

References

Mountains of Mac. Robertson Land